Gwa is a town located at the southern tip of Myanmar's Rakhine State. It is the principal town of Gwa Township. In the 2014 census, the town and surrounding rural areas had a population of 66,015, of which only 7,422 are urban.

Climate
Like all of Rakhine State, Gwa has a tropical monsoon climate (Köppen Am) with a lengthy dry season from mid-November to April and an extremely wet wet season due to the blocking of moisture-saturated westerly monsoon winds by the Arakan Mountains. Temperatures are very warm to hot throughout the year, although cool breezes and comfortable nights during the dry season make conditions fairly pleasant.

Economy 
Fishing is the primary industry in Gwa. Most residents fish in nearby waters, both for self-sustenance and trade with nearby towns. Rice, bamboo and coconuts are also widely grown in Gwa for export.

References

External links 
 18° 29' 0" North, 94° 17' 0" East Satellite map at Maplandia.com

Township capitals of Myanmar
Populated places in Rakhine State